The 2007 Kuomintang chairmanship by-election was held on 7 April 2007 in Taiwan between Wu Po-hsiung and Hung Hsiu-chu. This was the third direct election of the chairman in the Kuomintang history. All registered, due-paying KMT party members were eligible to vote. The previous leadership election had occurred in 2005.

The election was triggered by the resignation of chairman Ma Ying-jeou after he was indicted for allegedly misusing funds while Mayor of Taipei. The Taiwan High Court eventually cleared Ma of all corruption charges. The election, held on 7 April, was won by Wu Poh-hsiung.

References

2007 elections in Taiwan
April 2007 events in Asia
Kuomintang
2007
Kuomintang chairmanship by-election